Monwabisi Kwanda Mpahlwa  is the son of former South African President Thabo Mbeki and Olive Mpahlwa. His disappearance and presumed murder by  has been a matter of international interest.

Biography
Monwabisi Kwanda Mbeki known as Kwanda was born to then 16 year old Thabo Mbeki and high school sweetheart Olive Mphahlwa in 1959, in Butterworth, Eastern Cape. Thabo had to by Xhosa law pay a penalty for making an under-age girl pregnant and he gave five head of cattle.

Kwanda lived with Olive's family until the age of ten until moving in with Thabo's mother Epainette Mbeki (known as Ma Mofokeng) until he passed matric.

Disappearance
In 1976, Kwanda went into exile with one of Thabo's old comrades Phindile Mfeti. Kwanda had heard from Phindile that his father was in exile in Swaziland and decided to join him. Kwanda's voice was heard for the last time over a phone when he told Thabo's friend that he was in Durban.

Truth and Reconciliation Commission
In 1998, both Thabo and Olive spoke at the TRC and found that the last place Kwanda was seen alive was at the ANC military base in Tanzania. It was assumed that both Kwanda and Phindile were killed by the Apartheid government's forces.

In 2006, it was announced that a new enquiry was to be launched to try to find out what happened. It was noted that hundreds of bodies of ANC members killed by the authorities of the time have never been located.

References

1959 births
Living people